In Concert Volume Two is a live album by Christian singer Amy Grant, released in 1981.

In Concert Volume Two was the second album of a double live set, the other being In Concert, which was released earlier that year. Although the two should have been issued as a double album, budget problems forced the two to be released separately. In Concert Volume Two featured four new songs: "I'm Gonna Fly" (which became a Top Ten Christian radio hit), "You Gave Me Love" (a cover of the BJ Thomas song), "Fill Me With Your Love", and "Nobody Loves Me Like You" with DeGarmo & Key (originally on their 1980 album This Ain't Hollywood).

In 2007, In Concert Volume Two was reissued and digitally remastered by Grant's new record label, EMI/Sparrow Records. The remastered edition is labeled with a "Digitally Remastered" logo in the 'gutter' on the CD front.

Track listing

Personnel 
 Amy Grant – lead vocals
 Eddie DeGarmo – keyboards
 Gerry Peters – Oberheim OB-X synthesizer
 Dana Key – electric guitars, backing vocals
 Billy Sprague – acoustic guitars, backing vocals
 Mike Brignardello – bass guitar
 Greg Morrow – drums
 David Durham – backing vocals
 Theresa Ellis – backing vocals
 Jan Harris – backing vocals
 Gary Pigg – backing vocals

Production
 Brown Bannister – producer
 Michael Blanton – executive producer
 Dan Harrell – executive producer
 Jack Joseph Puig – engineer, mixing
 Malcolm Harper – mobile recording 
 Glenn Wexler – cover photography

References 

Amy Grant live albums
Albums produced by Brown Bannister
1981 live albums
Myrrh Records albums